Lambertville may refer to the following places:

Lambertville, California, former name of Freshwater, California
Lambertville, Michigan
Lambertville, New Jersey

See also
Lamberville (disambiguation)